Picayune is an Amtrak intercity train station at 200 South Highway 11, in the heart of downtown Picayune, Mississippi. The station is served by Amtrak's  passenger train. The station house was built in 2008 as a replacement for an open covered shelter. Like its predecessor, however, it is a flag stop, and only stops here when passengers have tickets either to or from the station.

Since the "suspension" of the Sunset Limited east of New Orleans in 2005, Picayune has been the only Amtrak station on the Mississippi Gulf Coast.

References

External links 

Picayune Amtrak Station (USA Rail Guide -- Train Web)

Buildings and structures in Pearl River County, Mississippi
Amtrak stations in Mississippi
Stations along Southern Railway lines in the United States